Račanin is a demonym of people of Rača, Bajina Bašta, or more often, an epithet of members of the brotherhood of the Rača monastery. It may refer to:

Čirjak Račanin (1660–1731), Serbian Orthodox monk and writer
Kiprijan Račanin (1650–1730), Serbian Orthodox monk and writer
Jerotej Račanin (1650–1727), Serbian Orthodox monk and writer
Teodor Račanin (1500–1560), Serbian Orthodox monk and writer
Simeon Račanin ( 1676–1700), Serbian Orthodox monk and writer
Hristifor Račanin (1595–1670), Serbian Orthodox monk and writer

Serbian surnames